Flueggea neowawraea, the mēhamehame, is a species of flowering tree in the family Phyllanthaceae, that is endemic to Hawaii. Associated plants include kukui (Aleurites moluccanus), hame (Antidesma pulvinatum), ahakea (Bobea sp.), alahee (Psydrax odorata), olopua (Nestegis sandwicensis), hao (Rauvolfia sandwicensis), and aiai (Streblus pendulinus). Native Hawaiians used the extremely hard wood of this tree to make weaponry.

Although it had declined along with other dry and mesic forest plants, many large trees could still be found until the 1970s.  At that point, the arrival of the black twig borer, (Xylosandrus compactus) caused a catastrophic collapse of the species.  Today, populations only exist in the northwestern part of Kauai, the Waianae Range on Oahu, the southwestern slopes of Haleakalā on Maui, and the Big Island's Kona coast.  Nearly all living individuals exist as basal shoots from older trees where the main trunk has died, or are outplanted saplings.  Because of the extreme durability of the wood and its easily  recognized fluted pattern, many dead trunks can still be found.

References

External links

 

neowawraea
Critically endangered plants
Plants described in 1987
Trees of Hawaii
Endemic flora of Hawaii
Taxonomy articles created by Polbot